Unbreakable is the ninth studio album by the German heavy metal band Primal Fear, and the first album with guitarist Alex Beyrodt. The album was released on 20 January 2012 in Europe, and 24 January in North America. Recording began at House of Music studios in Winterbach, Germany on 10 July 2011.

A music video was made for "Bad Guys Wear Black".

Track listing

Personnel
Band members
 Ralf Scheepers - lead and backing vocals
 Magnus Karlsson - guitars, keyboards
 Alex Beyrodt - guitars
 Mat Sinner - bass, vocals, backing vocals and production
 Randy Black - drums

Additional musicians
 Erik Mårtensson - backing vocals
 Oliver Hartmann - backing vocals

Production
 Jobert Mello - cover art, artwork
 Heiko Roith - photography
 Mat Sinner - producer
 Achim Köhler - mixing and mastering at Indiscreet Audio, Stuttgart, Germany
 Martin Müller - director ("Bad Guys Wear Black" music video)

References

Primal Fear (band) albums
Frontiers Records albums
2012 albums